Parapristella georgiae is a freshwater fish in the family Characidae of the order Characiformes. It is a tropical fish. It resides in the basins of the Meta River and Aguaro River.

References

Fish described in 1964
Freshwater fish of South America
Characidae